Basedowena is a genus of air-breathing land snails in the subfamily Hadrinae of the family Camaenidae.

Species
 Basedowena angatjana (Solem, 1993)
 Basedowena bethana (Solem, 1997)
 Basedowena bicolor Criscione & Köhler, 2016
 Basedowena cognata Solem, 1993
 Basedowena colmani (Solem, 1993)
 Basedowena cottoni Iredale, 1937
 Basedowena elderi (Bednall, 1892)
 Basedowena elfina (Iredale, 1939)
 Basedowena gigantea Solem, 1993
 Basedowena hinsbyi (Gude, 1916)
 Basedowena holoserica Criscione & Köhler, 2016
 Basedowena katjawarana Solem, 1993
 Basedowena olgana Solem, 1993
 Basedowena oligopleura (Tate, 1894)
 Basedowena papulankutjana Solem, 1993
 Basedowena polypleura (Tate, 1899)
 Basedowena radiata (Hedley, 1905)
 Basedowena siparium Criscione & Köhler, 2016
 Basedowena vulgata Solem, 1993
Synonyms
 Basedowena squamulosa (Tate, 1894): synonym of Granulomelon squamulosum (Tate, 1894)

References

 Solem, A. (1993). Camaenid land snails from Western and central Australia (Mollusca: Pulmonata: Camaenidae). VI. Taxa from the red centre. Records of the Western Australian Museum, Supplement, 43: 983–1459.

External links
 ]https://www.biodiversitylibrary.org/page/50655551 Iredale, T. (1937). An annotated check list of the land shells of south and central Australia. The South Australian Naturalist. 18(2): 6-59, pls 1-2]
 Criscione F. & Köhler F. (2016). Phylogenetic systematics of the land snail Basedowena from the Australian arid zone: taxonomic revision with description of new taxa (Stylommatophora : Camaenidae). Invertebrate Systematics. 30: 370-386

Camaenidae